

Oklahoma is a state in the South Central region of the United States.

Oklahoma may also refer to:

Arts and entertainment
 Oklahoma!, a 1943 Rodgers and Hammerstein musical comedy
 Oklahoma! (1955 film), based on the musical and starring Gordon MacRae and Shirley Jones
 Oklahoma! (soundtrack)
 "Oklahoma" (Rodgers and Hammerstein song), the musical's theme song and the state of Oklahoma's official song
 Oklahoma! (1999 film), starring Hugh Jackman
 Oklahoma (Keb' Mo' album), 2019
 "Oklahoma" (Billy Gilman song), 2000

Places
 Oklahoma, Mississippi, U.S.
 Oklahoma, Pennsylvania, U.S.
 Oklahoma City, the capital of the state of Oklahoma, U.S.
 Oklahoma County, Oklahoma in central Oklahoma, U.S.
 Oklahoma Territory, an organized territory of the U.S. (1890–1907) that became part of the state

Other uses 
 13688 Oklahoma, an asteroid 
 , the name of a U.S. Navy ship and a submarine
 SS Oklahoma (1908), tank steamer owned by the Gulf Refining Company, sunk in 1914.
 University of Oklahoma, in Norman, Oklahoma, U.S.
 Oklahoma, wrestling ring name of Ed Ferrara

See also
 
 
 Oklahoma City (disambiguation)